Marc Athanase Parfait Œillet des Murs (Paris, 18 April 1804 – Nogent-le-Rotrou, 25 February 1894) was a French amateur ornithologist and local politician and historian.

Life
His parents were Jacques Philippe Athanase Œillet Des Murs and Marie Henriette Gard.  He entered the magistracy in 1830 and left it in 1838.  In 1841 he became a lawyer in the Court of Cassation, but in 1846 retired to the department of Eure-et-Loir, where in 1843 he had bought a castle called the Château St. Jean near the town of Nogent-le-Rotrou and begun extensive restoration work on it.  He was the mayor of Nogent-le-Rotrou from 1860 to 1868.  In 1885, having sunk a good deal of his fortune into the restoration of the Château, he sold it.

He married Caroline Euphrasie Naulot, who survived him.

Ornithology
He published many papers.  His major ornithological works include
Iconographie Ornithologique, (1849), a book of illustrations and descriptions of birds.
The ornithological section of Voyage autour du monde sur la frégate la Vénus: Zoologie (Voyage Around the World on the Frigate Vénus: Zoology), in collaboration with Florent Prévost (1855), in which they described several new species.
Traité général d’oologie ornithologique au point de vue de la classification (A General Treatise on Ornithological Oology from the Point of View of Classification), 1860.  One reviewer praised the author's knowledge of oology but disagreed with his reliance on resemblances of eggs, with too little attention to other information, in the classification of birds.
Leçons élémentaires sur l'histoire naturelle des oiseaux (Elementary Lessons on the Natural History of Birds), a popularization of ornithology, in which he joined Jules Verreaux in collaborating with Jean-Charles Chenu.

History
His main historical work is Histoire des comtes du Perche de la famille des Rotrou de 943 à 1231 (History of the Counts of Perche of the Rotrou Family from 943 to 1231), 1856.

Surname
"Des Murs" is a known French surname meaning "of the walls". "Œillet" means "carnation" (or any Dianthus), so "Œillet des Murs" could be a rare surname meaning "carnation of the walls".  Which of those was his surname seems to have been unclear even during his lifetime.  His name appears on the title pages of his books as "M. O. des Murs" and as "O. des Murs" with no other names or titles, though he signs a dedication "P. O. des Murs".  It also appears as "O. des Murs" in books where the names of his co-authors, Chenu and Verreaux and Prévost, are given with initials and surnames, suggesting that he thought of "O." as his initial and "Des Murs" as his surname.  Likewise his contribution to Chenu's Encyclopédie d'histoire naturelle is listed as by "M. des Murs".  On the other hand, he was cited with the family name "Oeillet des Murs" in his time, on his death certificate and later, and Marc Oeillet des Murs appears as a writer on Normandy.

In ornithology he is referred to as "Des Murs".

References

External links

BHL Digitised Traité général d’oologie ornithologique au point de vue de la classification

French ornithologists
1804 births
1878 deaths
French male non-fiction writers
19th-century French historians
19th-century French male writers
Oologists